Khawaja Akmal was a veteran Pakistani television actor and comedian who was mostly popular for playing comic roles in Pakistani sitcoms. His notable work includes Bulbulay, Rusgullay, Batashay and Samandar Hai Darmiyan. He died of a heart attack on 26 November 2017.

References

1948 births
2017 deaths
Pakistani male television actors
Pakistani male comedians
People from Quetta
Male actors in Urdu cinema